Brachyscome  scapigera, commonly known as tufted daisy,  is a perennial herb in the family Asteraceae. The species is endemic to south-eastern Australia.

Description
This species has an erect growth habit, growing  to 40 cm high. The basal leaves are linear to oblanceolate and up to 19 cm long and 1.5 cm wide. The solitary flowerheads are about 12 mm in diameter with yellow centres and ray florets that are white or mauve. The main flowering period is between November and March in its native range.

Taxonomy
The species was formally described  in 1826 in Systema Vegetabilium and named Senecio scapiger. It was transferred to the genus Brachyscome in 1838.

Distribution
Brachyscome  scapigera frequently occurs in swampy areas in forests in Queensland, New South Wales the Australian Capital Territory and Victoria. In the latter state it occurs at altitudes above 600 metres and is associated with Eucalyptus pauciflora.

References

scapigera
Flora of the Australian Capital Territory
Flora of New South Wales
Flora of Queensland
Flora of Victoria (Australia)